John Magnier (born 10 February 1948; also known as "The Boss") is an Irish business magnate. He is Ireland's leading thoroughbred stud owner and has extensive business interests outside the horse-breeding industry.

Magnier has also been a Senator in the upper house of the Irish Parliament, Seanad Éireann. He is based at Coolmore Stud at Fethard in County Tipperary, considered one of the world's pre-eminent stallion stations, and a nursery of thoroughbreds.

Career

Origins
Magnier was born in Fermoy, County Cork, the eldest son of Thomas Magnier (1909–1962) a County Cork landowner (son of Michael Joseph Magnier of The Manor House, Fermoy, County Cork) by his wife Evelyn Margaret Hallinan (1925–2022), the younger daughter of Major Thomas Francis Dennehy Hallinan of Ashbourne, Glounthaune, County Cork. His aunt Mary Elizabeth Hallinan married Rupert Watson, 3rd Baron Manton, Senior Steward of the Jockey Club 1982–85, effectively the chief executive of the British horse racing industry.

Early life
Magnier received his formal education at Glenstal Abbey in County Limerick but had to leave school at 15 to take charge of the family estate near Fermoy after his father died.

Coolmore
Magnier later moved to Fethard, County Tipperary, where he transformed Coolmore Stud into a multi-million-euro international business. The business is headquartered in County Tipperary where a number of other stud farms are part of an extensive network which includes Longfield and Castlehyde studs. The operation also has branches in Versailles, Kentucky and at Jerrys Plains, New South Wales, Australia.

Magnier began his association with Coolmore in partnership with his father-in-law and champion racehorse trainer, Vincent O'Brien, and Vernon's Pools magnate, Robert Sangster. They developed the best racing horses and breeding stock, mainly by purchasing the progeny of the great Canadian stallion Northern Dancer. Their forays to the bloodstock auctions at Keeneland Sales furthered their rising stock at home. Eventually, Magnier came to head the operation and thus began an upward spiral of success. His racing empire, which became arguably the most successful on the planet, is nowadays powered by a huge string of blue-blooded thoroughbreds trained at Ballydoyle by Aidan O'Brien, plus dozens of others in the care of a number of other trainers.

Champion sires to have stood at Coolmore include the incomparable Sadler's Wells who was leading sire (by prizemoney won) in Great Britain and Ireland in 14 of the 15 years between 1990 and 2004, though his success in his later years was somewhat eclipsed by the astonishing exploits of three other Coolmore stallions, namely Danehill and his own sons Galileo and Montjeu. Other notable Group 1 winners who have turned successfully to stud duties are Danehill Dancer, Giant's Causeway, and Epsom Derby winner High Chaparral.

Less successful at Coolmore was George Washington, winner of the 2,000 Guineas and Queen Elizabeth II Stakes in 2006.  George Washington proved infertile, was returned to racing, and suffered a fatal breakdown in the 2007 Breeders' Cup Classic. George Washington was replaced at stud by another son of Danehill, Holy Roman Emperor, removed from training at the start of his three-year-old season.  The strength of thoroughbred talent residing at Coolmore is indicated by the fact that eleven of the fifteen winners of the blue riband of the turf, The Derby, between 1998 and 2012 were sired by Coolmore stallions (High Estate, Fairy King, Grand Lodge, Sadler's Wells (two), Danehill, Montjeu (four) and Galileo).

Other business ventures
Outside the equine business, Magnier has proven to be an astute investor and together with associates J. P. McManus, Dermot Desmond, Joe Lewis, Michael Tabor and Derrick Smith has enjoyed phenomenal success.  A high-profile venture was his stake of 28.89 per cent shareholding in football club Manchester United F.C., which was sold in May 2005 to Malcolm Glazer, an American businessman. A friendship with manager Alex Ferguson was tested in a dispute over bloodstock rights to prolific Group 1 winner (seven wins) Rock of Gibraltar which currently stands at Coolmore.

Wealth
Magnier is said to be the most influential man in horse racing and breeding worldwide, even over Sheikh Mohammed bin Rashid Al Maktoum. While Magnier's fortune is in the realms of speculation, The Sunday Independent estimated his wealth at €2.3 billion in 2018, although this is conservative as Coolmore Stud is valued at more than €4 billion alone, in addition to his personal property portfolio and other investments and holdings.

Personal life 
He is married to Susan O'Brien, a daughter of Irish racehorse-trainer Vincent O'Brien. The couple have five children.

References

External links
 Coolmore Stud
 "Rich List"
 "Magnier – The secretive tycoon" BBC

1948 births
Living people
Irish racehorse owners and breeders
Owners of Epsom Derby winners
Manchester United F.C. directors and chairmen
Independent members of Seanad Éireann
Members of the 18th Seanad
Businesspeople from County Cork
Nominated members of Seanad Éireann
People from Fermoy
Owners of Prix de l'Arc de Triomphe winners